Landline is an Australian national rural issues television program broadcast on ABC Television since 1991.

History
The program premiered in March 1991.

Previous presenters include Deborah Knight, Ticky Fullerton, Anne Kruger and Sally Sara.

Description
 Landline is presented by Pip Courtney, who has hosted the program since 2012.

The program discusses rural issues "ranging across agri-politics and economics, business and product innovation, animal and crop science, regional infrastructure, climate and weather trends, regional and rural services, music and lifestyle".

See also

 List of longest-running Australian television series
 List of programs broadcast by ABC Television
 List of Australian television series

References

External links
 Official website

Australian non-fiction television series
Australian Broadcasting Corporation original programming
1991 Australian television series debuts
1990s Australian television series
2000s Australian television series
2010s Australian television series
2020s Australian television series
English-language television shows
Television shows about agriculture
Rural society